Reaching for the Sun is a 1941 American comedy film directed by William A. Wellman and written by W.L. River. The film stars Joel McCrea, Ellen Drew, Eddie Bracken, Albert Dekker, Billy Gilbert, George Chandler and Bodil Ann Rosing. The film was released on May 2, 1941, by Paramount Pictures.

Plot

Backwoods boy Russ Elliott goes to the big city of Detroit, hoping to earn enough money to buy an outboard motor for his boat. He meets waitress Rita at a diner, after which, In the unemployment line, he befriends Benny Hogan as both land jobs on a factory's assembly line.

Russ and Rita begin a romance and get married. They have a child and Russ saves enough money to buy his outboard motor. He is unhappy at the plant, where a brute named Herman resents him and even tries to do Russ physical harm. Rita is unhappy, too, particularly after the factory's closure, when Russ and their boarder, Benny, are out of work for months.

Russ wants to return to his roots. Rita prefers life in Detroit and insists he sell his outboard motor. The factory reopens, but Herman causes an accident that costs Russ a leg. Rita agrees to make him happy by returning to his woodland home and boat, with Benny tagging along.

Cast
 Joel McCrea as Russ Elliot
 Ellen Drew as Rita 
 Eddie Bracken as Benny Hogan
 Albert Dekker as Herman
 Billy Gilbert as Amos 
 George Chandler as Jerryas Jerry 
 Bodil Rosing as Rita's Mother
 James Burke as  Norm
 Charles D. Brown as Johnson
 Regis Toomey as Intern
 Nella Walker as Nurse
 Adrian Morris as Rita's Partner, Dance Hall

References

1941 films
1940s English-language films
American comedy films
1941 comedy films
Paramount Pictures films
Films scored by Victor Young
Films directed by William A. Wellman
American black-and-white films
1940s American films